Masamichi Kuriyama is a Japanese handball coach of the Japanese national team.

References

Living people
Japanese handball coaches
Year of birth missing (living people)
21st-century Japanese people